Proteroctopus is an extinct genus of cephalopod that lived in the Middle Jurassic, approximately 164 million years ago. It is only known from a single species P. ribeti. The single fossil specimen assigned to this species originates from the Lower Callovian of Voulte-sur-Rhône in France. It is currently on display at the Musée de Paléontologie de La Voulte-sur-Rhône. While originally interpreted as an early octopus, a 2016 restudy of the specimen considered it to be a basal member of the Vampyropoda, less closely related to octopus or vampire squid than either of the two groups are to each other. A phylogenetic analysis by Kruta et. al indicates that Proteroctopus may be more closely related to the Vampyrpmorpha based on its unique morphology: two fins, head fused to the body, eight arms, two rows of oblique sucker, a gladius and absence of an ink sac. A 2022 phylogenetic analysis also found it to be more closely related to vampire squid than to octopuses.

The morphology of P. ribeti suggests a necto-epipelagic mode of life.

See also
Jeletzkya douglassae
Palaeoctopus newboldi
Vampyronassa rhodanica

References

External links

The Octopus News Magazine Online: Fossil Octopuses

Octopuses
Prehistoric cephalopod genera
Jurassic animals of Europe
Fossil taxa described in 1982